Teuta Arifi (born 19 October 1969) is a Macedonian politician of Albanian origin. In April 2013 Teuta Arifi was elected the Mayor of Municipality of Tetovo. Previous to her run for local elections, Teuta Arifi served as Deputy Prime Minister of the Government of the Republic of Macedonia in charge of European Affairs.
Arifi was the first Albanian woman to be elected in the Assembly of the Republic of Macedonia in 2002. She was subsequently re-elected as Member of Parliament in 2006, 2008, and 2011. 
She also holds the position of Vice-President of the Democratic Union for Integration (DUI), key political party of the Albanians in North Macedonia. She speaks Albanian, Macedonian, English, French, Italian and Turkish. 
 
Education

• 2000 PhD degree in Philology; Thesis: Representation of women in Albanian traditional law and in Albanian literature since the beginnings of the 20th century, Ss. Cyril & Methodius University in Skopje, North Macedonia;

• 1999 – 2001 Research fellow, CORE Institute, OSCE studies at Hamburg University;

• 1995 MA degree in Philosophy, Ss. Cyril & Methodius University in Skopje, North Macedonia;

• 1992 Fellowship at the Women Leadership Institute in Santa Fe, New Mexico, USA;

• 1991 BA degree in Philology, University of Prishtina, Republic of Serbia

Professional Experience:

• 28 July 2011 Deputy Prime Minister for European Affairs;

• 2008–2011 Member of Parliament, Head of Committee for International Relations (Organizing the first overseas hearing in Parliament on Bilateral agreements between North Macedonia and USA);

• 2006–2008 Member of Parliament, Head of Committee for Cultural Issues;

• 2006 – Columnist in the daily Macedonian newspaper ‘Dnevnik’;

• 2002–2006 Member of Parliament; Head of Committee for International Relations; member of Delegation of the Macedonian Parliament to the Council of Europe; Head of the Macedonian Parliamentary delegation to NATO

• 2002 – Deputy-president of the Democratic Union for Integration, key political party of Albanians in Macedonia;

• 2001 – 2006 Head of Teacher training Faculty at Southeast European University (SEEU) in Tetovo, North Macedonia;

• 2001– Member of Joint Boards of SEE University;

• 2001– Associate-professor in Multicultural Studies at the Teacher Training Faculty – SEE University, Tetovo, North Macedonia;

• 1998 – 2000 Deputy-chair of group of specialists of Council of Europe on positive actions in the field of equality between women and men;

• 1997 Assistant-professor on the subject of History of Albanian Literature, Faculty of Philology, Department of Albanian Language and Literature, University Ss. Cyril and Methodius in Skopje, North Macedonia;

• 1996–1997 Adviser in the Ministry of Foreign Affairs and Head of Department for relations with OSCE and other international organizations.

• 1995–1996, Adviser in the Government of Republic of Macedonia.

• 1992–2002 Anchor for Radio Deutsche Welle, South European Department, Cologne;

• 1991–1992, Columnist in the political weekly KOHA in Pristina.

Memberships

• 1999–2001 Member of research team of the Peace Institute, University of Hamburg, concerning the work of High Commissioner of Minorities in OSCE;

• 1998–2000 Member of advisory board of the Team tasked with research of the position of minorities in Southern Europe, CEI-Budapest;

• 1997–1999 Member of Board, Centre for Multicultural Understanding, Skopje;

• 1996–2000 Member of the Bureau of the Steering Committee on equality of Council of Europe, Strasbourg;

• May 1996, Member of OSCE team for observation of parliamentary elections in Albania September 1995, Member of delegation of the Republic of Macedonia to the 4th World Conference on Women Rights, Beijing;

• November 1996, member of Macedonian delegation to OSCE, Vienna, working group on Human Dimension;

• December 1995 – June 1996, Member of Board, Soros Open Society Institute in Macedonia;

• 1992–1994, Secretary General of the Helsinki Citizens Assembly Committee in Macedonia;

• 1994, Founding member of the Helsinki Committee for Human Rights in Macedonia;

• 1992, Founding member of the League of Albanian Women on North Macedonia;

Languages:

• Native: Albanian;

• Fully proficient in Macedonian, Turkish, English, French, Italian, Serbo-Croatian.

List of publications:

• “Gjeografia ime” (My geography), poetry, Shkupi, Skopje, 1996

• “Feminizmi ekzistencialist” (Existential Feminism), study, Shkupi, 1997

• “Uchestvo na zhenite vo sovremenite trendovi vo Republika Makedonija” (The participation of women in the contemporary trends of Macedonian Society) – study, co-authored, Friedrich Ebert Stiftung, Skopje, 1997;

• “Shatë ditë magjike” (Seven magic days), novel, Shkupi, Skopje, 1998.

Career
 12 April 2013 Elected Mayor of Municipality of Tetovo 
 2011–2013 Deputy Prime Minister for European Affairs
 2008–2011 Member of Parliament, Chair of the Committee for Foreign Affairs
 2006–2008 Member of Parliament, Chair of the Committee for Cultural Issues
 2002–2006 Member of Parliament; Chair of the Committee for Foreign Affairs; Member of the Delegation of the Macedonian Parliament to the Council of Europe; Head of the Macedonian Parliamentary delegation to NATO;
 2002 – Deputy-president of the Democratic Union for Integration

References

Living people
People from Tetovo Municipality
Albanians in North Macedonia
Deputy Prime Ministers of North Macedonia
Government ministers of North Macedonia
Mayors of places in North Macedonia
Democratic Union for Integration politicians
People from Tetovo
1969 births
21st-century Macedonian women politicians
21st-century Macedonian politicians